Jeffrey Archer known professionally as DJ JP is a New York-based Disk Jockey who was the official DJ to New York rapper Pop Smoke and has at various times worked with other artists such as, Cardi B,  Future, Migos, Boogie Bryson Tiller, and  Mavado. In 2020, DJ JP led Adidas’ annual 300 sneakers giveaway.

Education and career 
Born and raised in Brooklyn, New York, DJ JP studied Stage Management at La Guardia Community College where he was one of the star athletes at the college.  His DJ career started at early age when he played at family and friends events. In 2013, he began playing professionally and secured deals with some New York colleges to play at their shows when artists such as Jay-Z,Future, Migos, and A Boogie did their college performance. DJ JP was one of the DJs that played in the 2020 thanksgiving 97 hours mix.

References 

Living people
American DJs
Club DJs
Electronic dance music DJs
Year of birth missing (living people)